Empire Conrad was a  cargo ship that was built in 1942 by Charles Connell & Co Ltd, Clydebank for the Ministry of War Transport (MoWT). She was sold to a French company in 1952 and renamed Franta and then resold later that year and renamed Nia. In 1954, she was sold to a Panamanian company and renamed Eugenia. She served until 1967, when she was scrapped.

Description
The ship was built by Lithgow's Ltd, Port Glasgow, as yard number 963. She was launched on 23 March 1942, and completed in May.

The ship had a GRT of 7,009 and a NRT of 4,972.

The engine was built by J G Kincaird & Co Ltd, Greenock.

History
Empire Conrad was built in 1942 for the MoWT. She was placed under the management of Glen & Co Ltd. The Code Letters BDTG and United Kingdom Official Number 168983 were allocated. Her port of registry was Greenock.

On 20 May 1942, Empire Conrad departed from Milford Haven, Wales with a cargo of 32 Spitfires in cases. The aircraft were all Spitfire Mk VcT. Also on board were the ground crew who were to assemble them, a total of over 110 men. Empire Conrad was escorted by the 29th ML Flotilla and the corvette . Empire Conrad arrived at Gibraltar on 27 May. The aircraft were transferred to the aircraft carrier  where they were assembled. On 3 June, the aircraft were flown off Eagle bound for Malta. Twenty-eight of them arrived safely, with the other four being shot down en route.

Empire Conrad was a member of Convoy HG 84, which departed from Gibraltar on 10 June 1942, and arrived at Liverpool on 20 June. She was carrying iron pyrites and a general cargo and was bound for Leith and Hull.

Empire Conrad was a member of Convoy KMS 15, which departed the United Kingdom on 1 June 1943 bound for Gibraltar and the Mediterranean. She joined the convoy at Tripoli, Libya and left it at Port Said, Egypt.

Empire Conrad was a member of Convoy MKS 21, which departed from Alexandria, Egypt on 3 August 1943 and arrived at Gibraltar on 14 August, departing later that day for Liverpool, where it arrived on 25 August. Empire Conrad joined at Gibraltar, she was carrying a cargo of scrap metal and was bound for Manchester. In 1945, Empire Conrad was a member of Convoy KMS 92G, which detached from Convoy OS 118 at sea on 29 March.

Empire Conrad went to her assistance. In 1952, Empire Conrad was sold to P Atychiades, Marseilles, France and was renamed Franta. She was sold in 1954 to the Refast Steamship Co and was renamed Nia. She was operated under the management of Marcou & Sons Ltd, London. Later that year, she was sold to Ocean Tramp Tankers Corporation, Panama and was renamed Eugenia. She was reflagged to Liberia. In November 1956, Eugenia was one of a number of ships trapped in the Suez Canal, Egypt. She served until 1967, and was scrapped at Niihama, Japan in April 1967.

References

1942 ships
Ships built on the River Clyde
Ministry of War Transport ships
Empire ships
Steamships of the United Kingdom
Merchant ships of the United Kingdom
Steamships of France
Merchant ships of France
Steamships of Liberia
Merchant ships of Liberia